Les Présages is a ballet choreographed by Léonide Massine to music from Tchaikovsky's Symphony No. 5, with sets and costumes by André Masson. The premiere was performed on 13 April 1933 at the Opéra de Monte Carlo by the Ballets Russes de Monte-Carlo.

The ballet was Massine's first experiment with a plotless work based on symphonic music.

References

Sources
 Leslie Norton, 2004: Léonide Massine and the 20th Century Ballet, p. 147-154. McFarland

External links
 Joffrey Ballet: Les Présages
 Les Présages on YouTube (Australian tour 1936-1937)

Ballets by Léonide Massine
1933 ballet premieres
Ballets to the music of Pyotr Ilyich Tchaikovsky